Ibón de Sabocos is a lake in the Province of Huesca, northeastern Spain.

References

Sabocos
Geography of the Province of Huesca